Starksia fulva, known commonly as the yellow blenny, is a species of labrisomid blenny native to the Pacific coast of the Americas from Costa Rica to Ecuador. This species can reach a length of  TL.

References

fulva
Fish described in 1971
Taxa named by Richard Heinrich Rosenblatt